Pease Auditorium is a music venue on the campus of Eastern Michigan University in Ypsilanti, Michigan. Built in 1914, Pease auditorium is the 4th oldest standing building on Eastern Michigan University's campus. The auditorium was constructed in 1914 for $243,963. For the time, that was a considerable amount of money. Today Pease is home to the university's music performances and as well as some performing arts productions. With a seating capacity of 1,700, Pease is a prime spot for many events held by the community.

History of Pease Auditorium

Originally named Pierce Auditorium, the name was changed a year later to the Frederic H. Pease Auditorium. Frederic H. Pease was the professor of music from 1858 to 1909 and Head of Conservatory at Michigan State Normal School (former name for Eastern Michigan University). He was described as being, "very eager to help students develop their full potential for music". When Pease opened for the fall semester of 1914, it was considered to be one of the most modern and prestigious auditoriums of its time. The grand neoclassical façade and classical details of the interior made the acoustics top-of-the-line, and attracted many performers from across the country. Later in 1960, there was a large Aeolian-Skinner organ installed on the back of the stage. Then in 1959 new seats and a new stage floor was added. In 1993-1994 president William Shelton spent $2.2 million on renovations to electrical, plumbing and structural upgrades, as well as adding new seats and putting in a lighting system for performing arts performances. Then a celebrity "green room" was added in the back of the auditorium to accommodate the many celebrities that perform there.

Pease Auditorium has long been used by the Eastern Michigan University music department which today is housed under the Eastern Michigan University College of Arts and Sciences.

Contributors to upgrading Pease
Charles McKenny- President of Michigan State Normal School during the building of Pease auditorium. Raised funds and oversaw the successful building of Pease Auditorium.

John D. Pierce- Head of the music department from 1859 to 1909. Pease Auditorium was originally named Pierce auditorium before betting dedicated in 1915.

Frederic H. Pease- Professor of music from 1858 to 1909. He was a favorite among his students and the auditorium was dedicated in his name on October 11, 1915.

Frederick Alexander-A music professor in the early 1900s at Michigan State Normal school. Early in the construction of the auditorium he had visions of an organ being installed on the back part of the stage. Because of funding issues the organ was never installed in the original construction of the auditorium. In his will Alexander left $80,000 to the university to build the organ. Then in 1957 the organ was finally installed at a cost of $91,000 making it the most expensive organ in Michigan at the time.

Erich Goldschmidt- Professor of organ from 1955 to 1978 at Eastern Michigan University. Goldschmidt designed and tuned the massive organ installed in 1957.

William E. Shelton- President during the massive renovations that lasted from 1993 until late 1994.

References

Concert halls in Michigan
Buildings at Eastern Michigan University
Buildings and structures completed in 1914
1914 establishments in Michigan